Gross indecency is a crime in some parts of the English-speaking world, originally used to criminalize sexual activity between men that fell short of sodomy, which required penetration. The term was first used in British law in a statute of the British Parliament in 1885 and was carried forward in other statutes throughout the British Empire. The offence was never actually defined in any of the statutes which used it, which left the scope of the offence to be defined by court decisions.

History
The term gross indecency was first used in the Labouchere Amendment (section 11 of the Criminal Law Amendment Act 1885), which criminalized sexual acts between men, including those done in private.

Gross indecency statutes consequently spread throughout the British Empire. Canada adopted the term in section 178 of the Criminal Code in 1892. The term was also used in the Criminal Code (sections 206 (1906, 1927), 149 (1953–1954), 157 (1970), 161 (1985)) as well as in the Criminal Law Amendment Act (1968–1969, section 7); however, all statutes that used the term were repealed in 1985 with an amendment to both the Criminal Code and the Canada Evidence Act.

The United Kingdom later used the term in the Sexual Offences Act 1956 and in section 1(1) of the Indecency with Children Act 1960.

Notable cases
Oscar Wilde was charged and convicted of gross indecency in 1895. His trial and punishment is the subject of the 1997 play Gross Indecency: The Three Trials of Oscar Wilde.

Alan Turing pleaded guilty to the crime in 1952, the consequences of which led to his alleged suicide in 1954. Turing, who had been convicted of gross indecency for consensual, private homosexual acts, received a posthumous pardon in 2013. In 2017, under the Alan Turing law, all men convicted of gross indecency due to consensual, private sexual acts were pardoned.

Everett George Klippert was the last person in Canada to be arrested, charged, prosecuted, convicted, and imprisoned for gross indecency for homosexuality before the decriminalization of homosexual acts in 1969; the reform was a direct result of the Klippert case. In 1965 Everett George Klippert was interrogated by the police as part of an arson investigation in the Northwest Territories. Klippert was arrested after admitting that he had had sex with other men. When psychiatrists determined that he was unlikely to stop having sex with men, he was declared a dangerous offender and sentenced to life in prison. Maclean's, Canada's popular newsweekly, then printed an article sympathetic to homosexuals. This led to increasing calls to reform Canada's law on homosexuality. Klippert was released in 1971.

Current legislation

Australia

South Australia
In Australia, a gross indecency statute exists in South Australia, with gross indecency requiring the involvement of a minor (a person under 16 years old). A first-time offence is a three-year felony, and any subsequent offence is a five-year felony.

Kenya

Gross indecency between male persons of any age, in public or private, is a felony punishable by up to five years' imprisonment. Gross indecency is a lesser offence than sodomy, which is punishable by up to 14 years' imprisonment. LGBT rights activists are trying to repeal the law.

United States

Michigan
In the United States, Michigan is the only state that currently has gross indecency statutes. Michigan has three types of gross indecency crimes, all of which are five-year felonies:
 Gross indecency between male persons
 Gross indecency between female persons
 Gross indecency between male and female persons

Gross indecency between male persons was codified first, and the other two were made into laws later. Historically, the definition of gross indecency was unclear, and courts relied on nebulous notions such as the "common sense of society". The vagueness of the term allowed for adults who engaged in consensual sex with no monetary transactions in the privacy of their own homes to be charged with the crime, and men who had sex with men were particularly vulnerable to prosecution. Over time, the definition increasingly narrowed through Michigan Supreme Court decisions, and a 1994 decision officially narrowed it to sex acts that occurred in a public place or that involved a minor, the application of force, or a monetary transaction. Michigan now has separate statutes addressing all four aforementioned acts in statutes regarding indecent exposure, criminal sexual conduct (CSC), and prostitution; however, the gross indecency statutes remain in effect.

The gross indecency statutes have been criticized by LGBT rights activists.

See also 
Outraging public decency
Paragraph 175

References

Obscenity law
Sex crimes
Common law legal terminology
Governance of the British Empire